12 Gold Bars Volume II is a 1984 compilation album by English rock band Status Quo, released on Vertigo Records on 23 November 1984. It compiles all their UK hit singles from 1980 to 1984. The album was packaged as a gatefold vinyl LP and double cassette, containing 12 Gold Bars as a bonus album alongside Volume II.

Track listing

Side one
 "What You're Proposin'" (Francis Rossi/Bernie Frost) – 4:13
 "Lies" (Rossi/Frost) – 3:56
 "Something 'Bout You Baby I Like" (Richard Supa) – 2:48
 "Don't Drive My Car" (Rick Parfitt/Andy Bown) – 4:12
 "Dear John" (Jackie MacCauley/John Gustafson) – 3:11
 "Rock 'n' Roll" (Rossi/Frost) – 4:04

Side two
 "Ol' Rag Blues" (Alan Lancaster/Keith Lamb) – 2:48
 "Mess of Blues" (Doc Pomus/Mort Shuman) – 3:18
 "Marguerita Time" (Rossi/Frost) – 3:28
 "Going Down Town Tonight" (Guy Johnson) – 3:36
 "The Wanderer" (Ernie Maresca) – 3:30
 "Caroline" (Live at the N.E.C.) (Rossi/Bob Young) – 4:58

Charts

Certifications

References

1984 compilation albums
Status Quo (band) compilation albums